Bridges Act is a stock short title used in the United Kingdom for legislation relating to bridges.

List
Acts of the Parliament of England
The Bridges Act 1530 (22 Hen 8 c 5)
The Bridges Act 1670 (22 Car 2 c 12)
The Bridges Act 1702 (1 Anne c 12)

The Bridges Acts

The Bridges Acts 1740 to 1815 was the collective title of the following Acts:
The Bridges Act 1740 (14 Geo 2 c 38)
The Bridges Act 1803 (43 Geo 3 c 59)
The Bridges Act 1812 (52 Geo 3 c 110)
The Bridges Act 1814 (54 Geo 3 c 90)
The Bridges Act 1815 (55 Geo 3 c 143)

The Bridges (Ireland) Acts 1813 to 1875 was the collective title of the following Acts:
The Bridges (Ireland) Act 1813 (53 Geo 3 c 77)
The Bridges (Ireland) Act 1834 (4 & 5 Will 4 c 61)
The Bridges (Ireland) Act 1843 (6 & 7 Vict c 42)
The Bridges (Ireland) Act 1850 (13 & 14 Vict c 4)
The Bridges (Ireland) Act 1851 (14 & 15 Vict c 21)
The Bridges (Ireland) Act 1867 (30 & 31 Vict c 50)
The Bridges (Ireland) Act 1875 (38 & 39 Vict c 46)

See also
List of short titles

References

Lists of legislation by short title